Recsk is a large village in Heves County, Hungary. The Recsk mine is a large copper mine located in the north-east of Hungary in Heves County. Recsk represents one of the largest copper reserves in Hungary and in the world, having an estimated reserve of 770 million tonnes of ore grading 0.65% copper. From 1950 to October 1953 it was the site of a labor camp established by the Communist regime to hold political prisoners ranging from Smallholders, Social Democrats, Aristocrats and people with foreign contacts. György Faludy, a poet was held here. Modeled on Soviet gulag, Recsk held 1700 prisoners at its height.

References

External links

  in Hungarian

Populated places in Heves County
Copper mines in Hungary